St. Andrews Presbyterian Kirk is a church in downtown Nassau, Bahamas. The church was founded by fifty-five Scottish Presbyterian settlers in 1798, as the St. Andrews Society. On August 7, 1810 the foundation stone of the Kirk was laid, while in 1842 a Session room was added to the Kirk. In 1872 it started a mission School in Bin Town. In 1890s the manse was started.

It adheres to the Westminster Confession of Faith, Apostles Creed and the Nicene Creed and has several house fellowships. For several years it was affiliated with the Church of Scotland, but in 2010 it switched to affiliation with the Evangelical Presbyterian Church and is now affiliated with the EPC. The long range plan to form the Bahama Presbytery.

Lucaya Presbyterian Church in Grand Bahama is also affiliated with the EPC.
 St. Andrew's Presbyterian Kirk was founded by members of the St. Andrew Society and, under the direction of Rev. John Rae, began conducting services in the Court House in January 1810.
The first Nassau company of the Boy's Brigade began at St. Andrew's in 1909. Under the leadership of Rev. J. Herbert Poole, St. Andrew's School was founded in 1948. During the ministry of Rev. James Jack, Lucaya Presbyterian Kirk was founded and began holding regular services in Freeport, Grand Bahama in 1968. In 1994, another mission charge, Kirk of the Pines, was created in Marsh Harbour, Abaco.

References

External links
 St. Andrew's Presbyterian Kirk website  
 Lucaya Presbyterian Kirk website 
 Kirk of the Pines website Kirk of the Pines

Buildings and structures in Nassau, Bahamas
Churches in the Bahamas
Religious organizations established in 1798